The Official Audio Streaming Chart (previously the Official Streaming Chart) is a music chart based on plays of songs through audio streaming services (including Spotify, Deezer, Google Play Music, Apple Music, Amazon Music and Tidal) in the United Kingdom. It features data from both premium and ad-supported services. It is compiled weekly by the Official Charts Company (OCC), and was initially published both on their official website OfficialCharts.com (Top 100), and in the magazine Music Week (Top 75).

Number ones

See also
 List of Official Subscription Plays Chart number ones

Notes

References

External links
  at the Official Charts Company

British record charts
Lists of number-one songs in the United Kingdom